Dendrophilus punctatus is a species of clown beetle in the family Histeridae. It is found in Europe and Northern Asia (excluding China) and North America.

Subspecies
These two subspecies belong to the species Dendrophilus punctatus:
 Dendrophilus punctatus championi Lewis, 1886
 Dendrophilus punctatus punctatus (Herbst, 1791)

References

Further reading

External links

 

Histeridae
Articles created by Qbugbot
Beetles described in 1791